Adelaide United Football Club is an Australian women's soccer team based in Adelaide, South Australia. Founded in 2008, it is the affiliated women's team of Adelaide United. The team competes in the country's premier women's soccer competition, the A-League Women.

History

Establishment

Adelaide United's women's team was formed in 2008 with the inception of the W-League, becoming one of the founding eight teams. The inaugural set up saw North Eastern MetroStars coach Michael Barnett take charge with ex-Adelaide United player Richie Alagich take up the assistant coach role and Matildas stalwart Dianne Alagich named as captain.

2008–2011
Adelaide's first game was on 25 October 2008 against Queensland Roar at the Queensland Sport and Athletics Centre, which ended in a 4–1 loss with Sharon Black getting the consolation goal. The first win came in Round 2 against the Newcastle Jets at Hindmarsh Stadium, a hard-fought 3–2 win thanks to a hat-trick from Sandra Scalzi. The Reds followed this up with another 3–2 win over Sydney FC before failing to win any of their next seven league games, finished last in the eight-team competition in their inaugural season.

After a disappointing inaugural season drastic changes were made to the playing staff including the retirement of experienced campaigners Sharon Black and Dianne Alagich to create a youthful team for the 2009 season. Despite the new look squad Adelaide continued to struggle in the league failing to win any of the first 5 games which included a record equaling defeat against Sydney FC on 1 November 2009. The first goal of the 2009 season was scored by Tenneille Boaler against Newcastle Jets in the round 6 clash at the Wanderers Oval the game ended in a 3 – 3 draw handing Adelaide its second point of the year. The season didn't get any better for Adelaide as they failed to win a single game in the second season but thanks to an unlikely 2 all draw with power house team Brisbane Roar they finished the season in 7th place their best ever finish to date.
Most Valuable player for 2009 season Racheal Quigley.

The 2010–11 season was even worse for Reds as they lost all ten of their W-League matches.  They only scored four goals and finished with a disappointing −32 goal differential; they tied their worst defeat with a −1 loss to Newcastle in round nine.  Coach Michael Barnett was let go at the end of the disappointing season, and was replaced by David Edmondson.

Adelaide continued to struggle through most of the 2011–12 season as they opened the campaign with six more losses, scoring four goals during that time while letting twenty-one in.  This was better pace than the previous season, though, and the Reds showed significant improvement in on-field play versus 2010–2011, cited as being "unlucky" to not come away with at least a point on multiple occasions.  They finally snapped their winless and losing streaks, at 34 and 18 games respectively, with a 1–0 defeat of the Perth Glory in round eight, taking them off the bottom of the table for the first time since November 2009.

Following Adelaide United taking control of the women's team, their first move was signing Mark Jones as the head coach.

Stadium

Adelaide United WFC used to play their home games at Hindmarsh Stadium where they sometimes play a curtain-raiser to A-League games. As of the 2017/18 season, they play their home games at Marden Sports Complex. In the 2016/17 season, Hindmarsh Stadium was questioned about having portable change rooms for the women's team when there is a double header with the A-League side.  This resulted in Adelaide WFC having no matches scheduled during the next season.

Players

First-team squad

Former players
For notable current and former players, see :Category:Adelaide United FC (A-League Women) players.

Managers

Current technical staff

Manager history

Colours and badge
Since its inception Adelaide United has played in a predominantly all-red home kit. For the inaugural season the away kit consisted of a white top and socks and red shorts; during the 2009 season the away kit changed to a black top with red shorts and socks. The badge is heavily based on the Adelaide United men's team, with the logo being encased in a W-League shield; as is the case with every other W-League club.

Records

Last updated 18 December 2011
 Record Victory: 10 – 2 vs Western Sydney Wanderers, 14 January 2017
 Record Defeat: 0 – 6 vs Central Coast Mariners, 6 December 2008 and 14 November 2009, Sydney FC, 1 November 2009, 1 – 7 vs Newcastle Jets, 8 January 2011
 Undefeated Streak: 2, 31 October 2008 – 9 November 2008
 Without Winning:  34, 15 November 2008 – 10 December 2011
 All-time Leading Goal Scorer: Racheal Quigley, 7 goals.
 All-time Leading Appearances: Donna Cockayne, 27 Appearances.

See also
 List of top-division football clubs in AFC countries
 Women's soccer in Australia
 W-League (Australia) all-time records
 Australia women's national soccer team

References

External links
 Official club website

 
A-League Women teams
Adelaide United FC
Association football clubs established in 2008
Women's soccer clubs in Australia
2008 establishments in Australia

Adelaide United